Amblygaster is a small genus of sardinellas in the herring family Clupeidae.  It currently contains three species.

Species
 Amblygaster clupeoides Bleeker, 1849 (Bleeker's smoothbelly sardinella)
 Amblygaster leiogaster (Valenciennes, 1847) (Smoothbelly sardinella)
 Amblygaster sirm (Walbaum, 1792) (Spotted sardinella)

References
 

Clupeidae
Taxa named by Pieter Bleeker
Marine fish genera